Sara Maldonado Fuentes (born March 10, 1980) is a Mexican actress, better known for her role as Lorena Alvarez from El juego de la vida, which was her first main role and her first telenovela. After this, she was the protagonist in other teenage soap operas like Clase 406 and Corazones al límite. She is also known as Camelia Pineda "La Texana" from Camelia la Texana and other main roles.

Biography 
Maldonado was born in Xalapa, Veracruz, Mexico to parents Sara Fuentes and Mario Maldonado. She has two older brothers, Mario and Jesús, and one sister, Fabiola. She studied acting at the Centro de Educación Artística of Televisa for two years. In 2004, Maldonado also studied English and acting while residing in Vancouver, British Columbia, Canada. She participated in the Mexican beauty contest "El Rostro del Heraldo", which was organized by newspaper El Heraldo de México, and won first place.

Career 
Maldonado made her acting debut as the protagonist in the Televisa telenovela El juego de la vida (2001) as the role of Lorena "Lore" Alvarez. From 2002 to 2003, she starred in the teen telenovela hit Clase 406 as Tatiana "Tatis" del Moral. In April 2004, she was chosen again to the leading role as Diana Antillón de la Reguera in the Televisa telenovela Corazones al límite. She played the role as Paulina Cervantes Bravo in another Televisa telenovela Mundo de fieras. In 2008, she played the lead role as Aymar Lazcano Mayú in another Televisa telenovela Tormenta en el paraíso.

From November 2010 to May 2011, she played the title role in the Telemundo telenovela Aurora for the first 103 episodes, before her character was killed off, following her dismissal from the show. She also had a part La Reina del Sur (2011) as "La Verónica". She also starred in the telenovelas El octavo mandamiento as Camila San Millán (one episode, 2011) and Camelia la Texana (2014–15).

Filmography

Awards and nominations

References

External links
 
 

1980 births
21st-century Mexican actresses
Actresses from Veracruz
Living people
Mexican stage actresses
Mexican telenovela actresses
Mexican television actresses
People from Xalapa